The Insiders is an American drama series that aired on ABC from September 25, 1985, until June 2, 1986. starring Nicholas Campbell, Stoney Jackson and Gail Strickland.

Plot

Nick Fox is an undercover reporter who works for nationally syndicated Newspoint. Only Mackey, a hustler, ex-con and Nick's main contact on the street, and Alice West, the paper's editor, know his true identity.

Cast
Nicholas Campbell as Nick Fox
Stoney Jackson as James Mackey
Gail Strickland as Alice West

Episodes

Notes
The one season program aired on Wednesday nights on ABC in the fall of 1985.  It was directed by Bobby Roth, now known for the series Prison Break.  It is also known for its popular theme song "Just A Job To Do" by Genesis.
Stoney Jackson, who portrayed "Mackey," showed up in dozens of television series as a guest star  and is also credited as one of the lead dancers in Michael Jackson's video "Beat It". Repeats aired in June 1986 on Mondays at 8 with an episode that did not air originally in its time slot.

This show follows the smash hit success of Miami Vice, which it greatly resembled in style and content, and came from the same production company.

External links 

American Broadcasting Company original programming
Television series by Universal Television
American detective television series
1985 American television series debuts
1986 American television series endings
English-language television shows
Television shows set in Los Angeles